Hossam Youssif Muhammad Abdalla  (born 16 February 1988) is an Egyptian male volleyball player. He was part of the Egypt men's national volleyball team at the 2014 FIVB Volleyball Men's World Championship in Poland. He played for Al Ahly.

Sporting achievements

Clubs 
 Al Ahly SC  :

-  6 × Egyptian Volleyball League : 2008/09,2009/10,2010/11, 2012/13, 2013/14, 2017/18.

-  6 × Egyptian Volleyball Cup : 2007/2008, 2009/10, 2010/11, 2012/13, 2013/14, 2017/18 .

-  5 × African Clubs Championship (volleyball) :  2010 - 2011 - 2015 - 2017 - 2018.

-  1 × Arab Clubs Championship (volleyball) : 2010.

National team

  3 × Men's African Volleyball Championship : 2011-2013-2015
  1 × Arab Games :  2016

References

1988 births
Living people
Egyptian men's volleyball players
Place of birth missing (living people)
Volleyball players at the 2016 Summer Olympics
Olympic volleyball players of Egypt
Al Ahly (men's volleyball) players